DOT is a graph description language. DOT graphs are typically files with the filename extension gv or dot. The extension gv is preferred, to avoid confusion with the extension dot used by versions of Microsoft Word before 2007.

Various programs can process DOT files.  Some, such as dot, neato, twopi, circo, fdp, and sfdp, can read a DOT file and render it in graphical form.  Others, such as gvpr, gc, acyclic, ccomps, sccmap, and tred, read DOT files and perform calculations on the represented graph. Finally, others, such as lefty, dotty, and grappa, provide an interactive interface. The GVedit tool combines a text editor with noninteractive image viewer. Most programs are part of the Graphviz package or use it internally.

Syntax

Graph types

Undirected graphs 

At its simplest, DOT can be used to describe an undirected graph.  An undirected graph shows simple relations between objects, such as friendship between people.  The graph keyword is used to begin a new graph, and nodes are described within curly braces.  A double-hyphen (--) is used to show relations between the nodes.
// The graph name and the semicolons are optional
graph graphname {
    a -- b -- c;
    b -- d;
}

Directed graphs 

Similar to undirected graphs, DOT can describe directed graphs, such as flowcharts and dependency trees.  The syntax is the same as for undirected graphs, except the digraph keyword is used to begin the graph, and an arrow (->) is used to show relationships between nodes.
digraph graphname {
    a -> b -> c;
    b -> d;
}

Attributes 

Various attributes can be applied to graphs, nodes and edges in DOT files.   These attributes can control aspects such as color, shape, and line styles.  For nodes and edges, one or more attribute–value pairs are placed in square brackets ([]) after a statement and before the semicolon (which is optional). Graph attributes are specified as direct attribute–value pairs under the graph element, where multiple attributes are separated by a comma or using multiple sets of square brackets, while node attributes are placed after a statement containing only the name of the node, but not the relations between the dots.

graph graphname {
    // This attribute applies to the graph itself
    size="1,1";
    // The label attribute can be used to change the label of a node
    a [label="Foo"];
    // Here, the node shape is changed.
    b [shape=box];
    // These edges both have different line properties
    a -- b -- c [color=blue];
    b -- d [style=dotted];
    // [style=invis] hides a node.
}

HTML-like labels are only available on versions of Graphviz that are newer than mid-November 2003, in particular, they are not considered as part of release 1.10.

Comments 
Dot supports C and C++ style single line and multiple line comments.  In addition, it ignores lines with a number sign symbol (#) as their first character.
// This is a single line comment.
/* This is a
   multiple line
   comment. */
# Lines like this are also ignored.

A simple example 

Following is an example script that describes the bonding structure of an ethane molecule.  This is an undirected graph and contains node attributes as explained above.
graph ethane {
    C_0 -- H_0 [type=s];
    C_0 -- H_1 [type=s];
    C_0 -- H_2 [type=s];
    C_0 -- C_1 [type=s];
    C_1 -- H_3 [type=s];
    C_1 -- H_4 [type=s];
    C_1 -- H_5 [type=s];
}

Layout programs 

The DOT language defines a graph, but does not provide facilities for rendering the graph.  There are several programs that can be used to render, view, and manipulate graphs in the DOT language:

General 

 Graphviz – a collection of CLI utilities and libraries to manipulate and render graphs into different formats like SVG, PDF, PNG etc.

JavaScript

 Canviza JavaScript library for rendering DOT files
 d3-graphviza JavaScript library based on Viz.js and D3.js that renders DOT graphs and supports animated transitions between graphs and interactive graph manipulation
 Vis.jsa JavaScript library that accept DOT as input for network graphs.
Viz.js – a JavaScript port of Graphviz that provides a simple wrapper for using it in the browser.
 hpcc-js/wasm Graphviza fast WASM library for Graphviz similar to Viz.js

Java

 Gephian interactive visualization and exploration platform for all kinds of networks and complex systems, dynamic and hierarchical graphs
 Grappaa partial port of Graphviz to Java
 graphviz-javaan open source partial port of Graphviz to Java available from github.com
 ZGRViewera DOT viewer

Other

 Beluginga Python- & Google Cloud Platform-based viewer of DOT and Beluga extensions
 dot2texa program to convert files from DOT to PGF/TikZ or PSTricks, both of which are rendered in LaTeX
 OmniGrafflea digital illustration application for macOS that can import a subset of DOT, producing an editable document (but the result cannot be exported back to DOT)
 Tulipa software framework in C++ that can import DOT files for analysis
 VizierFXan Apache Flex graph rendering library in ActionScript

Limitations 
While the DOT format allows the user to specify layout details via positional attributes, most tools rely on automated layout algorithms. These algorithms are best efforts and sometimes produce undesirable results.

For example:

There are presentation problems in the image titled "An image that seems improperly rendered". The square on the right is not a perfect square, and some labels are misaligned with their arrows (such as (g o f)').

This can be fixed with a vector graphics editor. In some cases, this can also be fixed by using the pos attribute to specify a position, and the weight attribute to square the graph.

See also 
 lisp2dot tool to convert Lisp programming language-like program trees to DOT language. Designed for use with genetic programming.

Notes

External links 
 DOT tutorial and specification
 Drawing graphs with dot
 Node, Edge and Graph Attributes
 Node Shapes
 Gallery of examples
 Online graph visualization in SVG
 Boost Graph Library

Mathematical software
Graph description languages
Graph drawing